Afterword on Rupert Brooke is a poem by F. T. Prince published in 1976.  Prince's note on the poem states, "The verse is syllabic, in a measure of twelve syllables devised by Robert Bridges." He is referring to Bridges' Neo-Miltonic Syllabics.  Prince writes that Bridges' poem "Poor Poll" was his first illustration of the meter's potentialities, and remains the best guide to its structure.  He also states that he allowed himself fewer elisions than did Bridges in the later and more famous example of the meter,  The Testament of Beauty (1930), and that he aimed for a "greater variety of rhythm" than displayed in Bridges' poem.

References
 Prince, F. T., Collected Poems: 1935 – 1992, The Sheep Meadow Press, 1993. 

British poems